Novaya Kirga (Yañı Kirge) is a rural locality (a village) in Sandugachevsky Selsoviet, Yanaulsky District, Bashkortostan, Russia. The population was 51 as of 2010. There is 1 street.

Geography 
Novaya Kirga is located 24 km east of Yanaul (the district's administrative centre) by road. Barabanovka is the nearest rural locality.

References 

Rural localities in Yanaulsky District